LK Zug is a Swiss women's handball club from Zug. 
They won four national championships between 2010 and 2016. They have been a regular in EHF competitions since the 1990s, participating twice to the EHF Champions League.

Kits

Titles
 Swiss Premium League (5)
 2010, 2013, 2014, 2015, 2021
 Swiss Cups (4)
 2014, 2015, 2021, 2022
 Swiss Supercup (1)
 2016

European record

Team

Current squad
Squad for the 2016–17 season

Goalkeepers
  Marion Betschart 
  Jennifer Hotz 
  Laura Innes
  Sarah Stocker 
Wingers
LW
  Stefanie Javet
RW
  Laura Masset
  Stefanie Stücheli
Line players
  Alena Müller
  Soka Smitran

Back players
LB
  Daphne Gautschi
  Shanice Kägi
  Sibylle Scherer
CB
  Ria Estermann
  Ivana Ravlic
  Leah Stutz
  Svenja Stutz
RB
  Daria Betschart
  Yael Gwerder
  Martina Traber
  Nina Van Polanen

References

External links
 
 

Swiss handball clubs
Zug